Scruby may refer to:

 Jack Scruby (1916-1988), manufacturer
 Ron Scruby (1919-2011), Anglican priest and archdeacon